Markus Brzenska (born 25 May 1984) is a German football coach and former player.

Early life
Markus Brzenska's parents, Joachim and Halina, and his older brothers, Sebastian and Marcin, were originally from the Upper Silesian town of Bytom (German Beuthen). They immigrated to Germany as ethnic Germans (Aussiedler), settling in Lünen near Dortmund, where Markus was born a few weeks after their arrival.

Club career

Borussia Dortmund
Without any top level match experience, he was included in the starting line-up by coach Matthias Sammer in Borussia Dortmund's match against Bayern Munich on 9 November 2003. His debut ended in a send-off during the first half.

In 2004, when coach Bert van Marwijk arrived, such like some other players with whom the coach was less familiar, Brzenska's ability was overlooked. Eventually, his effort turned things around. He returned to the first team squad during the first half of the 2004–05 season and established his place in the starting line-up since then.

Energie Cottbus
During the 2008–09 season, he was loaned to 2. Bundesliga club MSV Duisburg. At the end of the loan, Duisburg were unable to pay the transfer fee that Dortmund were asking for, so he returned to Borussia Dortmund who then sold him to Energie Cottbus.

International career
His family comes from Poland so he is eligible to play for Poland. In October 2010 he declared his intention to play for the Poland national team. He played 15 games for the Germany U21 national team.

References

External links

1984 births
Living people
People from Lünen
Sportspeople from Arnsberg (region)
German footballers
German people of Polish descent
Germany under-21 international footballers
Borussia Dortmund players
Borussia Dortmund II players
MSV Duisburg players
FC Energie Cottbus players
FC Viktoria Köln players
Association football defenders
Bundesliga players
2. Bundesliga players
Regionalliga players
FC Viktoria Köln managers
Footballers from North Rhine-Westphalia